The United States men's national CP soccer team, formerly known as the United States Para 7-a-side national team, represents the United States in men's CP football international competitions. It is operated by the United States Soccer Federation. The team finished seventh at the 2015 IPCPF World Championships.  They have competed at several Paralympic Games, including the 1984, 1992, 1996, 2004 and 2012 editions.  One of their best finishes was in 1996 when they finished fourth. Their head coach is Stuart Sharp. Comedian Josh Blue is one of their former players.

The U.S. Para 7-a-side National Soccer Team (USPNT) is an elite level program that selects players from across the United States in preparation for International standard competition. The National Team, in addition to friendly matches and invitational tournaments, competes in the following events: Intercontinental Cup, Copa America, World Championships, Parapan American Games, Paralympic Games.

For players to be eligible, they must be ambulant (no requirement for assistive walking aids) and have one of the following neurological conditions, have had a Stroke, have Cerebral Palsy, have had a Traumatic Brain Injury / Acquired Brain Injury.

Individuals with the above conditions may display varying degrees of the following impairments: Diplegia, Hemiplegia, Triplegia, Quadriplegia, Monoplegia, Dystonia, Athetosis, Ataxia, Balance issues, Co-ordination issues, Weakness in certain areas of the body.

In many cases the above conditions may result in only minimal levels of motor dysfunction (some not noticeable to the untrained eye); however, under the rules of the sport, this could still make players eligible for the U.S. Paralympic National Team.

"Football 7-a-side" is the standard term for the game informally known as "C.P. Football," and international tournaments are hosted by the International Paralympic Committee, FIFA, or International Federation of CP Football IFCPF. Team selection and tournaments are competitive, and tend to be run like professional sport organizations.  The USA team trains at the Olympic Training Center at Chula Vista, California, and the Home Depot Center at Carson, California.

Background 

The national team is managed by the US Soccer Federation. Current Head Coach Stuart Sharp, has been his role since 2014. In 2012, the team was coached by Jay Hoffman. While the United States was active in participating in the IFCPF World Championships and Paralympic Games by 2016, the country did not have a national championships to support national team player development.

Ranking 

The United States was ranked fourth in the world by the IFCPF in 2019. That same year, the team is also ranked third in the Americas. In September 2012, August 2013 and November 2014, the team was ranked ninth in the world. In July 2011, the team was ranked  eighth.

Players 
There have been a number of players for the American squad.

Results 

The United States has participated in a number of international tournaments. Six teams participated in the Toronto hosted American Cup in 2014. Group A included Venezuela, Argentina and Canada.  Group B included Mexico, Brazil and the United States.  The tournament was important for preparations for the 2015 Parapan American Games, and because it was the last major continental level competition of the year.

The United States has also played in a number of friendlies. In December 2011, Canada and the United States played a series of three friendly matches in Chula Vista, California.  Canada won the opener 4 - 2.  They then repeated this score in the second match.  The United States won the third game 2 - 3.

IFCPF World Championships 
The United States has participated in the IFCPF World Championships.

Paralympic Games 

The United States has participated in 7-a-side football at the Paralympic Games.

Paralympic Results

References

External links
 US Soccer
 International Paralympic Committee

Paralympic
United States at the Paralympics
PARA
1913 establishments in the United States
National cerebral palsy football teams
Football 7-a-side teams at the 1984 Summer Paralympics
Football 7-a-side teams at the 1996 Summer Paralympics
Football 7-a-side teams at the 1992 Summer Paralympics
Football 7-a-side teams at the 2004 Summer Paralympics
Football 7-a-side teams at the 2012 Summer Paralympics
Football 7-a-side teams at the 2016 Summer Paralympics